Russian Embassy School in Paris is a Russian international school in Paris, France, serving grades 1 through 11.

It is in the 16th arrondissement, on the grounds of the Russian Embassy in Paris (FR/RU).

It was established by the Soviet Union Ministry of Foreign Affairs, with classes starting in September 1954.

See also
France–Russia relations
French schools in Russia:
Lycée français Alexandre Dumas de Moscou
École française André-Malraux in Saint Petersburg
École française - Mlf - PSA in Kaluga

Notes

External links
Russian Embassy School in Paris 
Russian Embassy School in Paris 

Russian international schools in France
Lycées in Paris
1954 establishments in France
Educational institutions established in 1954
France–Soviet Union relations